Jake Eastwood (born 3 October 1996) is an English footballer who plays as a goalkeeper for Rochdale on loan from Sheffield United.

Having come through the Sheffield United academy he has previously spent time on loan with Sheffield, Gainsborough Trinity, Mickleover Sports, Chesterfield, Scunthorpe United, Kilmarnock, Grimsby Town, Portsmouth and Rochdale.

Career

Youth
Born in Rotherham, South Yorkshire, Eastwood joined Sheffield United's youth academy at the age of 10. In his youth, he has spent time on loan with Sheffield, Gainsborough Trinity and Mickleover Sports for first team experience.

Sheffield United
In April 2016, Eastwood was one of four youth players to sign professional terms with Sheffield United. He started the 2017–18 season as deputy to loanee Jamal Blackman, who himself was signed to cover for injured first team keeper Simon Moore. On 9 August 2017, Eastwood made his senior first-team debut in the Football League Cup in a 3–2 home victory over Walsall at Bramall Lane. He started again in the Blades' next tie in the League Cup which ended in a 4–1 home defeat to the visitors Leicester City of the Premier League, which knocked the Blades out of the competition.

In November 2017, Eastwood signed a new long-term contract, committing to the Blades until 2020. He then joined Chesterfield on an emergency loan.

On 5 July 2019, Eastwood joined Scunthorpe United on a season-long loan deal. After injuries to Sheffield United goalkeepers Simon Moore and Michael Verrips, he was recalled by his parent club in January 2020. As a result, he was on the bench for their Premier League game against West Ham United.

On 30 July 2020, Eastwood signed for Scottish Premiership club Kilmarnock on a six-month loan. He made his debut on 1 August 2020, in Kilmarnock's opening game of the season, away to Hibernian, however he had to be substituted at half-time due to injury. On 11 January 2021, he returned to Sheffield United after making two appearances in all competitions.

On 1 February 2021, Eastwood joined League Two side Grimsby Town on loan for the remainder of the 2020-21 season. Eastwood temporarily took over as first choice keeper having been favoured to regular James McKeown but an injury suffered in March limited him to 7 appearances.

On 7 September 2021, Eastwood signed for League One side Portsmouth on a seven-day emergency loan in order to play in an EFL Trophy tie against AFC Wimbledon. Portsmouth's first choice keeper Gavin Bazunu was on international duty with the Republic of Ireland, whilst his understudy Alex Bass was isolating due to COVID-19, Portsmouth lost the game 5-3.

Eastwood returned to Scotland by joining Scottish Premiership side Ross County on loan for the 2022-23 season. In January, Eastwood returned to Rochdale on loan until the end of the season having failed to make a league appearance in Scotland.

Career statistics

References

External links
Official Profile at www.sufc.co.uk

Living people
1996 births
English footballers
Association football goalkeepers
Sheffield United F.C. players
Sheffield F.C. players
Gainsborough Trinity F.C. players
Mickleover Sports F.C. players
Chesterfield F.C. players
Scunthorpe United F.C. players
Kilmarnock F.C. players
Grimsby Town F.C. players
Portsmouth F.C. players
Rochdale A.F.C. players 
Ross County F.C. players
Northern Premier League players
English Football League players
Scottish Professional Football League players